The Constitution Alteration (Industrial Matters) Bill 1912, was an unsuccessful referendum held in 1913 that sought to alter the Australian Constitution to give the Commonwealth legislative power in respect to industrial matters.

Issues

Question
Do you approve of the proposed law for the alteration of the Constitution entitled 'Constitution Alteration (Industrial Matters) 1912'?

The proposal was to alter the text of section 51 of the Constitution to read as follows:
51. The Parliament shall, subject to this Constitution, have Legislative power to make laws for the peace, order, and good government of the Commonwealth with respect to:
(xxxv.) Conciliation and arbitration for the prevention and settlement of industrial disputes extending beyond the limits of any one State:
Labour, and employment, and unemployment, including-
(a) the terms and conditions of labour and employment in any trade, industry, occupation, or calling;
(b) the rights and obligations of employers and employés;
(c) strikes and lockouts;
(d) the maintenance of industrial peace; and
(e) the settlement of industrial disputes.

Results

Discussion
The 1911 referendum asked a single question that dealt with trade and commerce, corporations and industrial matters.  This resolution separated each of those matters into a different question. Like its forebear, none of these resolutions were carried. On each of the many occasions a similar question was asked at a referendum the public decided not to vest power in the Commonwealth over these matters.

1911 referendum on trade and commerce

See also
Politics of Australia
History of Australia

References

Further reading
 Standing Committee on Legislative and Constitutional Affairs (1997) Constitutional Change: Select sources on Constitutional change in Australia 1901–1997. Australian Government Printing Service, Canberra.
 Bennett, Scott (2003). Research Paper no. 11 2002–03: The Politics of Constitutional Amendment Australian Department of the Parliamentary Library, Canberra.
 Australian Electoral Commission (2007) Referendum Dates and Results 1906 – Present AEC, Canberra.

Referendum (Industrial Matters)
1913 referendums
1913 (Industrial Matters)